1944 is a year.

1944 may also refer to:
 1944 (film), a 2015 Estonian film
 1944 (album), a 2016 album by Jamala
 "1944" (song), a song performed by Jamala
 1944 (EP), an EP by Soul-Junk
 1944: The Final Defence, a 2007 Finnish film
 1944: The Loop Master, a 2000 vertical scrolling shooter arcade game

See also
 1944 BC